is a former Japanese football player. He played for Japan national team.

Club career
Sakiya was born in Hiroshima on December 1, 1950. After graduating from high school, he joined Yawata Steel (later Nippon Steel) in 1969. He retired in 1981. He played 193 games and scored 48 goals in the league.

National team career
In September 1971, Sakiya was selected Japan national team for 1972 Summer Olympics qualification. At this qualification, on September 27, he debuted against Philippines. He played 3 games for Japan until 1972.

National team statistics

Awards
 Japan Soccer League Fighting Spirit: 1969

References

External links
 
 Japan National Football Team Database

1950 births
Living people
Association football people from Hiroshima Prefecture
Japanese footballers
Japan international footballers
Japan Soccer League players
Nippon Steel Yawata SC players
Association football forwards